The Communist Party of Canada is a federal political party in Canada. It may also refer to:

 Provincial wings of the Communist Party of Canada:
 Communist Party of Canada (Alberta)
 Communist Party of Canada (British Columbia)
 Communist Party of Canada (Manitoba)
 Communist Party of Canada (Ontario)
 Communist Party of Canada (Saskatchewan)
 Communist Party of Canada (Marxist–Leninist), an anti-revisionist federal political party unrelated to the Communist Party of Canada
 Revolutionary Communist Party (Canada), an unregistered Marxist–Leninist–Maoist political party focused on direct action rather than participation in elections